Desire is the second solo album from hip hop artist Pharoahe Monch, released on June 26, 2007. The album comes eight years after the rapper's critically acclaimed solo debut, Internal Affairs, which followed the break-up of Monch's former group Organized Konfusion. After a short stint on Geffen Records, a number of labels began a bidding war for the rapper, including Eminem's Shady Records, Denaun Porter's Runyon Ave. Records, Bad Boy Records and Sony Records. In early 2006, it was announced that Pharoahe had signed a deal with Steve Rifkind's Street Records Corporation for the release of his second album. The first song released from the album was "Let's Go", produced by Black Milk. "Let's Go" was featured as the B-side on the album's first proper single, "Push", released in September 2006. A music video for "Push" was also released in late September 2006, and has received play on MTV Base. The video is set in the New York City blackout of 1977. A ten-minute internet-only video for the track "When the Gun Draws" was released exclusively to AllHipHop.com on January 3, 2007. Desire features production from Monch, longtime collaborator Lee Stone, The Alchemist, Denaun Porter, Black Milk and Sean C. Album guests include Erykah Badu and Denaun Porter. The single Desire is featured in the video game Madden 08.

The album received critical acclaim, just like Internal Affairs. As of July 11, 2007, the album has sold 17,026 copies in the US.

Track listing

Notes
 On the song "Fuck You" the explicit version is 12 seconds longer than the edited version.

Samples
"Free" contains elements from the composition "I'm Free" performed by Millie Jackson.
"Desire" contains elements from the composition "The Picture Never Changes" written by Holland-Dozier-Holland. The track also samples "Ante Up" performed by M.O.P.
"Push" contains interpolations from the composition "Country Preacher" written by Josef Zawinul.
"Welcome To The Terrordome" contains elements from the compositions "Welcome to the Terrordome" written by Public Enemy and "Come On and Get It" written by H.D. Rogers.
"Hold On" contains elements from the composition "I'll Get By Without You" performed by Wah Wah Watson.
"So Good" contains elements from the composition "My Place" written by Tweet.
"Bar Tap" contains elements from the composition "Deliver the Word" performed by War (U.S. band).

Album singles

Charts

References

External links
Pharoahe Monch website

2007 albums
Pharoahe Monch albums
Albums produced by the Alchemist (musician)
Albums produced by Mr. Porter
Albums produced by Black Milk